Omia is a genus of moths of the family Noctuidae.

Species
 Omia banghaasi Stauder, 1930
 Omia cyclopea (Graslin, 1837)
 Omia cymbalariae (Hübner, 1809)

References
Natural History Museum Lepidoptera genus database
Omia at funet

Cuculliinae